Comic or Comics may refer to:

Arts and entertainment
Comic, another term for a comedian
The Comic, a 1969 comedy film directed by Carl Reiner
Comics!, a 1990s Canadian TV series
Comics (British TV series), a 1993 miniseries
Comics or comic, a storytelling medium using sequential images and words, such as:
Comic book
Comic strip
Comics, an app for reading comics from ComiXology
"Comics", a track on the Caravan Palace album <|°_°|>

Aviation
Comic, a nickname of the night fighter version of the Sopwith Camel, a World War 1 aircraft
Comic, a nickname of a variant of the Sopwith 1½ Strutter, a World War 1 aircraft

See also
Comedian (disambiguation)
Comedy
Comix